Xavier, Guayaquil is a private Catholic pre-school, primary and secondary school, located in Guayaquil, Ecuador. The school was established as a school for boys in 1956 by the Society of Jesus; and became coeducational in 2004.

History
Xavier was founded by the Jesuits in Guayaquil in 1956, with 52 students. Construction of today's campus began in 1957. The college went coeducational in 2004. After an earthquake in 2010 the Ecuadoran government contributed to the rebuilding of the school.

See also

 Catholic Church in Ecuador
 Education in Ecuador
 List of Jesuit schools

References  

Jesuit secondary schools in Ecuador
Educational institutions established in 1956
Private schools in Ecuador
1956 establishments in Ecuador
Jesuit primary schools in Ecuador
Schools in Guayaquil